Yeste is a municipality in the province of Albacete, Castile-La Mancha, Spain, 138 km far from the capital, Albacete. In 2018 it had a population of 2,674.

It is known for the nearby La Vicaria Arch Bridge.

Localities 
 Moropeche

References 

Municipalities of the Province of Albacete